Abraham M. Rudman (July 1, 1896 – September 30, 1970) was a justice of the Maine Supreme Judicial Court from March 1, 1965, to December 14, 1966.

Born in Bangor, Maine, Rudman graduated from the University of Maine School of Law in 1917, and served in the United States Navy during World War I. Rudman was appointed to the Superior Court in 1954. Appointed to the Maine Supreme Court by Governor Burton Cross,  Rudman was the first Jewish justice to serve on that Court. His son Paul Rudman later served on the same court.

References

Justices of the Maine Supreme Judicial Court
1896 births
1970 deaths
University of Maine School of Law alumni
People from Bangor, Maine
20th-century American judges